Yvette Mattern (born San Juan, Puerto Rico) is a New York and Berlin based visual artist whose work has an emphasis on video and film, which frequently intersects performance, public art and sculpture. Her work has been exhibited internationally.

Education 
Mattern studied and has a Master of Fine Arts degree from Columbia University.

Global Rainbow
Her ongoing monumental laser light installation Global Rainbow has been presented over ten times since 2009 including: launching the London 2012 Cultural Olympiad in the Northeast, Northwest England and Northern Ireland, Transmediale 2010 in Berlin, Germany, Nantes, Metz and Toulouse France, New York City with Art Production Fund, New Haven, CT and a special presentation in Pittsburgh with Lightwave International. It   2012 it was projected above Manhattan skies as "an uplifiting light on those destroyed by the terror and darkness cast by Superstorm Sandy."  It was also featured in Toronto, Ontario for Nuit Blanche in 2014.

The Global Rainbow installation beams seven rays of high specification laser light, representing the spectrum of the seven colors of the rainbow. The artist had been inspired by seeing an unusual rainbow in a beautiful spot at ‘Walden Pond’ in Massachusetts. Mattern aims to connect all demographics in a beautifully engaging experience. She sees her work as a visual translation of hope and peace.

Personal life 

Yvette Mattern is married to Georg Polke, son of German Painter Sigmar Polke (2014–present). Yvette Mattern has one son, Maximilian Mattern-Knuesel and three step-children with Georg Polke. She lives between Berlin, Germany and the United States.

References 

Living people
People from San Juan, Puerto Rico
Puerto Rican women artists
Laser art
Year of birth missing (living people)
21st-century American women artists
Women conceptual artists
Artists from Berlin
Puerto Rican artists
Columbia University alumni